Districts of the Czech Republic are territorial units, formerly used as second-level administrative divisions of the Czech Republic. After their primary administrative function has been abolished in 2003, they still exist for the activities of specific authorities and as statistical units. Their administrative function was moved to selected municipalities.

Establishment
In 1960, Czechoslovakia was re-divided into districts (okres, plural okresy) often without regard to traditional division and local relationships. In the area of the Czech Republic, there were 75 districts; the 76th Jeseník District was split in the 1990s from Šumperk District. Three consisted only of statutory cities Brno, Ostrava and Plzeň which gained the status of districts only in 1971; Ostrava and Plzeň districts were later expanded. The capital city of Prague has a special status, being considered a municipality and region at the same time and not being a part of any district, but ten districts of Prague (obvody) were in some ways equivalent to okres.

Municipalities with extended competence
A reform in effect since January 2003 replaced the districts with 205 Administrative Districts of Municipalities with Extended Competence (abbreviated AD MEC; správní obvody obcí s rozšířenou působností, abbreviated SO ORP), also called third-level municipalities, or unofficially "little districts". These municipalities took over most of the administration of the former district authorities. The old districts still exist as territorial units and remain as seats of some of the offices, especially courts, police and archives.

In 2007 the borders of the districts were slightly adjusted and 119 municipalities were moved into different districts. In 2021 another reform was made and 18 municipalities were moved between districts or between administrative districts of municipalities with extended competence.

After the 2021 reform, borders of AD MECs respect borders of districts, with only exception granted by law being AD MEC of Turnov, which is partly in districts of Semily, Jablonec nad Nisou and Liberec. The reasons are the vastness of this territory and different requirements of the territory's population.

Municipalities with commissioned local authority
Administrative districts of municipalities with extended competence are further divided into 393 Administrative Districts of Municipalities with Commissioned Local Authority (abbreviated AD CLA; správní obvody obcí s pověřeným obecním úřadem, abbreviated SO POÚ), also called "second-level municipalities"). A municipality with commissioned local authority is a municipality to which the state delegates part of its powers, but not to the extent that it delegates it to a municipality with extended competence.

Maps of districts

List of districts

See also
Regions of the Czech Republic
ISO 3166-2:CZ

References

 
Subdivisions of the Czech Republic
Districts
Czech Republic 2
Districts, Czech Republic